Bayerius is a genus of sea snails, marine gastropod mollusks in the family Buccinidae, the true whelks.

Species
Species within the genus Bayerius include:
 Bayerius arnoldi (Lus, 1981)
 Bayerius fragilissimus (Dall, 1908)
 Bayerius holoserica (Lus, 1971)
 Bayerius inflatus Kantor, Kosyan, Sorokin, Herbert & Fedosov, 2020
 Bayerius knudseni (Bouchet & Warén, 1986)
 Bayerius nekrasovorum Kantor, Kosyan, Sorokin, Herbert & Fedosov, 2020
 Bayerius solidus (Lus, 1978)
 Bayerius ultraabyssalis (Lus, 1989)
 Bayerius zenkevitchi (Lus, 1975)
 Brought into synonymy 
 Bayerius peruvianus Warén & Bouchet, 2001: synonym of Bayerius zenkevitchi (Lus, 1975)

References

 lsson A. A. (1971). Mollusks from the Gulf of Panama collected by R/V John Elliott Pillsbury. Bulletin of Marine Science. 21(1): 35-92
 Lus V.J. (1971). A new genus and species of gastropod molluscs (family Buccinidae) from the ultra-abyssal of Kurile-Kamchatka Trench. [In Russian]. Trudy Instituta Okeanologii AN SSSR. 92: 61-72.
 Lus V.J. (1978). New genus and species of Buccinidae from the lower-abyssal zone of Idzu-Bonin Trench in Pacific zone. [in Russian]. Trudy Instituta Okeanologii 
 Lus V.J. (1989). The deepest gastropods Buccinacea (Neogastropoda: Buccinacea). [in Russian]. Trudy Instituta Okeanologii [Transactions of the P.P. Shirshov institute of Oceanology]. 123: 151-164.

External links
  Kantor Y.I., Kosyan A., Sorokin P., Herbert D.G. & Fedosov A. (2020). Review of the abysso-hadal genus Bayerius (Gastropoda: Neogastropoda: Buccinidae) from the North-West Pacific, with description of two new species. Deep Sea Research Part I: Oceanographic Research Papers. 160: 103256

Buccinidae